Essikado is a town in the Western region of Ghana. It is 12 kilometres from the centre  Takoradi and 3 minutes drive from Sekondi.The Western region capital. It is used mainly as a dormitory town for various workers who work in the regional capital and its environs. The town is in the Essikado-Ketan constituency of Ghana.

Boundaries
 
The town is bordered on Ngyiresia on the East, Ketan on the West, Kojokrom  on the North and Gulf of Guinea and Sekondi on the south.

Notable places
The Essikado Polyclinic  is one of the major health centres in the Takoradi Metropolis. The health facility offers a wide range of medical services.

References

Populated places in the Western Region (Ghana)